The 1893 Oberlin Yeomen football team represented Oberlin College during the 1893 college football season.  In its first and only season under head coach Everett B. Camp, the team compiled a record of 6–1, including victories over Ohio State, Chicago, and Illinois. The 1892 and 1893 teams combined for a 13-game winning streak that was broken on November 18, 1893, in a loss to the Case School of Applied Science.

Schedule

References

Oberlin
Oberlin Yeomen football seasons
Oberlin Yeomen football